The Sir David Brand Award for Tourism is the highest award for tourism in Western Australia, named after Sir David Brand (1912-1979), who was Premier of Western Australia from 1959 to 1971. It was established in 1972 as a single award, and is now the highest honour in the Western Australia Tourism Awards.

The awards were established in 1972, by John Wood, founder of the Fleetwood caravan company. He said later: 

Speaking in parliament in 2013 John Day commented that David Brand's widow Lady Brand, then aged 92, had at that time attended all but one of the 41 presentation ceremonies for the award.

Winners

2019: Busselton Jetty
2018: Kimberley Wild Expeditions
2017: Horizontal Falls Seaplane Adventures
2016: ADAMS Coachlines
2015: Sandalford Wines
2014: Broome's Cable Beach Club Resort & Spa
2013: Kings Park and Botanic Garden
2012: Challenger Institute of Technology, School of Hospitality & Tourism
2011: Eco Beach Broome
2010: Willie Creek Pearl Farm
2009: Augusta Margaret River Tourism Association
2008: Augusta Margaret River Tourism Association
2006: Willie Creek Pearl Farm
2001: Perth Zoo
1998: Aviair
1997: Aviair
1996: Aviair
1994: Feature Tours
1993: The Burswood Resort
1992: Esplanade Hotel, Albany
1984: York Motor Museum
1983: Atlantis Marine Park (closed 1990)
1978: Elizabethan Village

References

Tourism in Western Australia

External Links 

 Tourism Council WA - Business Awards